Haiderpur wetland is a UNESCO Ramsar site located near the Bijnor Ganga Barrage within the Hastinapur Wildlife Sanctuary in Uttar Pradesh, India.

Formation and Geography
Haiderpur wetland is one of the largest human-made wetland that was formed in 1984 after the construction of Madhya Ganga Barrage. The region is fed by the Ganges and its tributary Solani river, constituting an area of 6908 hectare within the Hastinapur Wildlife Sanctuary in Muzaffarnagar and Bijnor districts. The wetland lies in the strategic Central Asian Flyway which is as an important stop over site for the winter migratory birds.

Biodiversity

Bird species
The wetland is home to over 320 species of birds, which includes many globally threatened species. Commonly observed avian species includes, Partridge, Quail, Peafowl, Pigeon, Falcon, Hawk, Spot-billed duck, Crane, Eagle, Owl, White vulture, Cuckoo and Nightingale. Kingfisher, Myna, Red-vented bulbul, Sparrow, Baya weaver among others are also found in abundance in the wetland.

Other fauna
Among the mammals, Leopard, Wildcats, Monkeys, Fox, Wolf, Nilgai, Jackal, Mongoose, Honey badger, Barasingha, Wild boars, Rabbits, Muskrats and Bats inhabit the wetland and surrounding sanctuary region. Reptiles such as, Monitor lizard, Python, Indian cobra, Krait and Viper are found in large numbers. A significant population of IUCN Red List critically endangered Gharial (Gavialis gangeticus) and many vulnerable amphibian species are observed in the wetland and the adjoining Ganga river basin.

Conservation Status
Following the conservation efforts of wildlife activists and involvement of local community, Haiderpur is designated as the 47th Ramsar site, a wetland of international importance in April 2021. The World Wide Fund for Nature and the government have initiated several schemes for the conservation and management of Haiderpur wetland.

Gallery

See also
 Hastinapur Wildlife Sanctuary
 Wildlife sanctuaries of India

References

External

eBird Hotspot Haiderpur Wetland

Bird sanctuaries of Uttar Pradesh
Protected areas of Uttar Pradesh
Wetlands of India
Ramsar sites in India